Manhattan Cafe, (5 March 1998 – August 2015) was a Japanese Thoroughbred racehorse and sire. Unraced as a juvenile he began his racing career as a three-year-old in 2001. He improved throughout the season, winning three minor races before developing into a top class stayer in autumn when he recorded Grade I wins in the Kikuka Sho and the Arima Kinen. He won the Tenno Sho as a four-year-old and was retired from racing after an unsuccessful bid for the Prix de l'Arc de Triomphe. Manhattan Cafe later became a highly successful breeding stallion. He died in 2015.

Background
Manhattan Cafe was a brown horse standing 16.3 hands (1.70 metres) with a narrow white blaze bred in Hokkaido, Japan by Shadai Farms. He was sired by Sunday Silence, who won the 1989 Kentucky Derby, before retiring to stud in Japan where he was champion sire on thirteen consecutive occasions. His other major winners included Deep Impact, Stay Gold, Heart's Cry, Zenno Rob Roy and Neo Universe. Manhattan Cafe's dam Subtle Change won three races in Ireland before being exported to become a broodmare in Japan. She was a descendant of the outstanding German broodmare Schwarzblaurot, the ancestor of numerous major winners including Sagace, Slip Anchor, Stacelita, Zagreb and Buena Vista.

As a foal, the colt was put up for auction at the JRHA Select Sale and was sold for ¥136,500,000. He entered the ownership of Ken Nishikawa and was sent into training with Futoshi Kojima. He was ridden in most of his races by Masayoshi Ebina.

Racing career

2001: three-year-old season
Manhattan Cafe began his racing career in a maiden race over 2000 metres at Tokyo Racecourse on 29 January in which he finished third of the fifteen runners behind Treasure. He recorded his first success in a similar event over 1800 metres at the same track twelve days later, winning from Isao Heat. The colt was then stepped up in class for the Grade II Hochi Hai Yayoi Sho (a major trial for the Satsuki Sho) over 2000 metres at Nakayama Racecourse on 4 March and finished fourth behind Agnes Tachyon. On his final start of his spring campaign, Manhattan Cafe finished unplaced behind Scenography in the Azarea Sho at Hanshin Racecourse in April.

After a break of almost four months, Manhattan Cafe returned in August for two races at Sapporo Racecourse. Racing over 2600 metres he won the Furano Tokubetsu on the fourth of the month and followed up in the Akanko Tokubetsu over the same distance three weeks later. On 16 September the colt was moved back up to Grade II level for the St Lite Kinen over 2200 metres at Nakayama and finished fourth of the sixteen runners behind Shinko Calido, Treasure and Lord Forester. Manhattan Cafe was then moved up further in class for the Grade I Kikuka Sho over 3000 metres at Kyoto Racecourse on 21 October and started a x/1 outsider in a fifteen-runner field. His opponents included Jungle Pocket and Dantsu Flame who had finished first and second in the Tokyo Yushun. The outsider Meiner Despot took the lead from the start and set a slow pace with Ebina positioning Manhattan Cafe behind the leaders on the inside. Manhattan Cafe overtook Meiner Despot in the straight and won by half a length, with few of the most fancied runners ever making a challenge. After the race Futoshi Kojima said "When I saw the start and him going into the turn on the first lap, I thought we had a chance of winning. He was relaxed and the others weren't coping well. I knew we had the best horse for such a pace over the distance"

Manhattan Cafe was one of the horses invited to contest the Arima Kinen at Nakayama on 23 December, a race which saw him matched against older horse for the first time. His opponents included T M Opera O, T M Ocean (Hanshin Juvenile Fillies, Oka Sho, Shuka Sho), Narita Top Road (1999 Kikuka Sho), Shinko Calido, Meisho Doto (Takarazuka Kinen) and To The Victory (Queen Elizabeth II Commemorative Cup). He was restrained by Ebina before producing a strong late run to take the lead 150 metres from the finish and won by one and a quarter lengths from American Boss with To The Victory a neck away in third.

2002: four-year-old season
On 23 March 2002, Manhattan Cafe began his second season in the Grade II Nikkei Sho at Nakayama. He started favourite but finished only sixth of the eight runners behind Active Bio. On his next appearance he was one of eleven horses to contest the spring edition of the Tenno Sho over 3200 metres at Kyoto on 28 April. Narita Top Road started favourite with Manhattan Cafe next in the betting on 1.9/1 ahead of Jungle Pocket and Sunrise Pegasus. Ridden as usual by Ebina he won by a neck and half a length from Jungle Pocket and Narita Top Road.

Manhattan Cafe was rested until autumn when he was sent to Europe to contest the 81st running of the Prix de l'Arc de Triomphe over 2400 metres as Longchamp Racecourse on 6 October. Starting at odds of 8.3/1 he turned into the straight in seventh place but faded to finish thirteenth of the sixteen runners behind Marienbard.

Assessment and awards
In January 2003, Manhattan Cafe was voted Best Older Male Horse of 2002 at the JRA Awards.

Stud record
After his retirement from racing, Manhattan Cafe became a breeding stallion at the Shadai Stallion Station in Hokkaido where he replaced his recently deceased sire. He was the Leading sire in Japan in 2009. Manhattan Cafe is also the broodmare sire of T O Keynes, the winner of several Grade 1 dirt races including the 2021 Champions Cup.

Major winners
c = colt, f = filly, g = gelding

Manhattan Cafe died at the age of seventeen in August 2015.

Pedigree

References 

1998 racehorse births
2015 racehorse deaths
Racehorses bred in Japan
Racehorses trained in Japan
Thoroughbred family 16-c